Mohammad Abdul Jalil was a freedom fighter and Mukti Bahini Sector Commander of Sector 9 of during the Bangladesh liberation war in 1971. He was also one of the founding members of political party Jatiyo Samajtantrik Dal.

Early years
Mohammad Abdul Jalil was born at Wazirpur in Barisal District on 9 February 1942. He passed the matriculation examination from Wazirpur WB Union Institution in 1959, IA examination from Murry Young Cadet Institution, and joined the Pakistan army as trainee officer in 1962. He obtained his graduation and M A in History during his service in the army. M. A. Jalil was promoted to the post of Captain in 1965, and was elevated to the position of Major in 1970. In February 1971, Major Jalil came to Barisal on leave from his place of posting in Multan, and joined the war of liberation in March.

Bangladesh Liberation War
Mohammad Abdul Jalil had pioneering role in floating the new political party Jatiyo Samajtantrik Dal (JSD) in October 1972. At the inception of the party he was the joint convener, and was elected chairman of the party in the council session held on 26 December 1972.

The JSD under his leadership endeavored to establish '"scientific socialism" in the country and was altogether active in anti-government politics. Mohammad Abdul Jalil contested from seven constituencies in the Jatiya Sangsad elections in 1973 with no return. Major Jalil was arrested while launching a program of the party activists to besiege the official residence of the then Home Minister on 17 March 1974. He was released on 8 November 1975. Major Jalil was again arrested on 25 November by the martial law government for his alleged conspiracy for the overthrow of the government and attempts at usurping the state power. He was sentenced to life imprisonment in a trial by the special military tribunal. He was, however, released on 24 March 1980.

Major Jalil contested in the presidential election in 1981 as a nominee of the three-party alliance of JSD, Workers Party and Krishak-Sramik Samajbadi Dal. He was left chairmanship of the JSD in 1984. 16 days later, on 20 October 1984, he started a party called Jatiya Mukti Andolon. At this time he was active in creating Shommilito Shongram Parishad, under the leadership of Late Hafejji hujur. He was under house-arrest in January 1985 for one month. He was put in Dhaka Central jail from 30 December 1987 to March 1988, for joining the protest against autocrat Ershad.

Notable works
 Seemahin Samay (1976)
 Dristibhangi O Jiban Darshan
 Surjodoy (1982)
 Arakshita Swadhinatayi Paradhinata (1989)
 Bangladesh Nationalist Movement for Unity: A Historical Necessity

Death and legacy
He died in Islamabad, Pakistan on 19 November 1989. His body was brought to Dhaka on 22 November 1989, and buried at the Mirpur Graveyard for Intellectuals with full honor. A bridge in Barisal is named after him.

References

1942 births
Pakistani defectors
Bangladesh Liberation War
1989 deaths
People from Barisal
Bangladesh Army officers
Mukti Bahini personnel
Jatiya Samajtantrik Dal politicians
Burials at Mirpur Martyred Intellectual Graveyard